3-Phenylazoacetylacetone (or phenyl-azo-acetylaceton) is a chemical compound used as an intermediate in the preparation of biologically active compounds, chelating agents, and dyes.

Preparation has been described as involving the gradual addition of a solution of benzenediazonium chloride exactly neutralized with sodium carbonate to a cold solution of acetylacetone in aqueous sodium carbonate.

References

Additional sources 
 Baeyer and Claisen's phenylazoacetylacetone (Abstr., 1888, 828)

Azo compounds
Diketones
Phenyl compounds